Auchen Castle is a wedding destination near Moffat, Dumfries and Galloway, Scotland. With 26 bedrooms, a private lake and falconry school, it has a 5-star rating by the Scottish tourist board. The castle has hosted celebrity guests such as the Beatles, Barbara Cartland, Margaret Thatcher and the King of Norway, and is a wedding venue which has attracted several celebrity weddings in recent years.

History 
The original castle dates back to 1220 built by Sir Humphrey de Kirkpatrick when he was Senestal of Annandale. The Kirkpatrick family, close allies of Robert the Bruce and King Robert would have been entertained at Auchen Castle often. The Kirkpatrick clan has long since moved from their seat at Auchen Castle and their estates and holdings came under the ownership of the Clan Johnstone.

The Johnstone's remain Lords of Annandale to this day. The castle as it is today was largely completed in 1849 by General Johnstone. Through marriage, the castle then went on to Sir William Younger, 1st Baronet, of Auchen Castle of the Youngers brewery family. The castle still maintains many original features; such as the Victorian spring water catchments and reservoirs that supply the castle today. In the castle grounds there are many unusual species of trees and plants, brought to the estate over the centuries, some of which have a rich history and are of unusual varieties.

Weddings 
The castle is one of Scotland's most sought after wedding destinations, and is used exclusively for weddings.
In 2007 it was the venue for the wedding of model Michelle Marsh to footballer Will Haining, which appeared in OK! magazine. The castle hosted ITV's Good Morning Britain which broadcast four weddings live on the lead up to Valentines day 2016.

Architecture 
Auchen Castle is well known for its architectural curiosities and its design is layered in symbolism, earning it the nickname, "Egypt".  General Johnstone who build the castle as it is today, served under Sir Ralph Abercromby in Egypt against the French in 1801 and it is thought that the design of the castle and the estate were laid out to show the positions of units in the Battle of the Nile. The floor plan is made up of two wings, running East to West and North to South. These two wings connect three corners of an isosceles triangle.  At each of these corners there are three rooms of a similar design, with an octagonal box window in each with five sides of the octagon, showing on the outside, but the interior three sides are missing.  This rule of three applies throughout the castle.  At the entrance, in the form of three steps with two Corinthian pillars lead into the castle via a checkered floor, symbolic of the entrance to King Solomon's temple. Opposite the entrance there are a set of 21 steps, ascending a stepped pyramid shaped garden and surmounted by two sphinxes. When the rule of three within the castle itself is applied to this, and the number of steps is divided by it, the number is seven. This is the number of stages in the construction of a ziggurat, which is the original name for a pyramid.

References

External links
Auchen Castle Website

Hotels in Dumfries and Galloway
Castles in Dumfries and Galloway
1220s establishments in Scotland
Buildings and structures completed in 1849
Hotels established in the 1950s
1950s establishments in Scotland